Adrienne Marie "Audie" England (born July 12, 1967) is an American actress and professional photographer.

Life and career
England was born in Los Angeles, California, and graduated from UCLA with a concentration in cinematography.

When she was 26, England was asked by Zalman King to star in his film version of Anaïs Nin's Delta of Venus. Since then, England has appeared in several Zalman King productions, including guest appearances on the film series Red Shoe Diaries.  Audie also appeared in the music video of Don Henley's The Boys of Summer, which won the MTV Video Music Award for Video of the Year at the 1985 MTV Video Music Awards.

Besides being a regular in King's movies, England is best known for her role as Claire in Free Enterprise. She has appeared in 14 movies and has made several guest appearances on various television shows.

In 1998, England was voted one of People'''s "Most Beautiful Stars."

Filmography
 Delta of Venus (1994) as Elena Martin
 Venus Rising (1995) as Eve
 Miami Hustle (1996 TV) as Jean Ivers
 One Good Turn (1996) as Kristin
 Ice (1998 TV) as Julie
 A Place Called Truth (1998) as Lizzie
 Soundman (1998) as Francesca
 Legion (1998 TV) as Dr. Jones
 Shame, Shame, Shame (1999) as Lani
 Free Enterprise (1999) as Claire
Diagnosis Murder (1999 TV) as Chloe Marsden

References

External links

Photography

1967 births
American film actresses
American photographers
Living people
UCLA Film School alumni
American women photographers
Actresses from Los Angeles
21st-century American women